The European Medium Altitude Long Endurance Remotely Piloted Aircraft System (MALE RPAS), or Eurodrone, is a  twin-turboprop MALE UAV under development by Airbus, Dassault Aviation and Leonardo for Germany, France, Italy and Spain, with a first flight expected by mid-2027.

Development

On 18 May 2015, France, Germany and Italy launched a European MALE RPAS study over two years, joined by Spain since, to define its operational capabilities, system requirements and preliminary design.
In November 2015, the program management was assigned to the European defence procurement agency OCCAR, with European Defence Agency support for air traffic integration and certification.
The definition study was to be contracted in the first half of 2016, the potential development and production then aiming for a 2025 first delivery. 

A two-year definition study was launched in September 2016. Airbus, Dassault Aviation and Leonardo unveiled a full-scale mockup at the April 2018 ILA Berlin Air Show.
On 31 October 2018, OCCAR invited Airbus Defence and Space to submit a tender for the program, to coordinate the major sub-contractors, Dassault and Leonardo.
On 22 November, the System Preliminary Design Review was achieved, allowing the stakeholders to align their requirements and contract in 2019.

In late May 2019, Airbus submitted its offer, but the contract signing may slip from 2019 to 2020.
In the summer, the French Senate criticised the platform as "too heavy, too expensive and therefore, too difficult to export" due to "German specifications".
First flight was then scheduled for 2024, before first deliveries for 2027.

Due to the impact of the COVID-19 pandemic on the aviation industry, contract signing slipped to 2021, selecting the Airbus site at Manching for final assembly and ground testing.
The maiden flight was then scheduled for 2025, before first deliveries for 2028 of a contract for 60 drones.

On 24 February 2022, the development and production contract was approved. The prototype first flight is expected by mid-2027.
On 25 March 2022, Airbus Defence & Space confirmed the selection of the General Electric Catalyst turboprop over the Safran Ardiden 3TP.

Design

Missions targeted are long endurance intelligence, surveillance and reconnaissance and ground support with precision-guided weapons.
The twin-turboprops are mounted in a pusher configuration behind the wing, similar to the smaller BAE Systems Mantis, and one-third larger than the MQ-9.

The drone's dual engines were a demand of Germany, which intended to use the UAV for surveillance over domestic urban areas and was concerned that an engine failure in a single-engine drone could lead to the drone crashing into a house. France, which intends to use the system over conflict zones such as the Sahel, has been critical of its cost and weight. At 11,000 kg, it is over twice as heavy as an MQ-9 Reaper. A French politician overseeing the RPAS project, Christian Cambon, criticized it as suffering from "obesity."

Operators

 French Air and Space Force - 12 drones (4 systems) on contract

 German Air Force - 21 drones (7 systems) on contract

 Italian Air Force - 15 drones (5 systems) on contract

 Spanish Air Force - 12 drones (4 systems) on contract

Specifications

See also

References

External links

 
 Airbus Eurodrone webpage
 Dassault Eurodrone webpage
 Leonardo MALE RPAS webpage

Medium-altitude long-endurance unmanned aerial vehicles
Low-wing aircraft
Twin-engined pusher aircraft
Unmanned military aircraft of Germany
Unmanned experimental aircraft
International proposed aircraft
Unmanned aerial vehicles of Spain
Unmanned military aircraft of France
Unmanned military aircraft of Italy
International unmanned aerial vehicles